2007 in esports

Team Final Boss  beat Team Carbon to win the MLG Las Vegas 2007 National Championship.

The Championship Gaming Series began in 2007, with the 2007 Championship Gaming Series season

 
Esports by year